Neil Ferguson is the name of:

 Neil Ferguson (epidemiologist) (born 1968), British infectious disease epidemiologist
 Neil Ferguson (footballer) (1945–2016), former Australian rules footballer
 Neil Ferguson, musician with British band Chumbawamba

See also
 Niall Ferguson (born 1964), British historian
 Niels Ferguson (born 1965), Dutch cryptographer
 Neil Layton Fergusson (1908–1994), Canadian politician